Elamgulam Sree Dharma Sastha Temple is a Hindu temple in India, located in the state of Kerala. It is situated on Main Eastern Highway (SH-8) with its landmark panoramic temple ground in the village of Elamgulam in Kottayam district. The annual festival conducted by the temple, with about 15 elephants, namely Gajamela(Elephant congregation) and Aanayoottu(Elephant feeding), makes it famous among the state. Thousands of people participate in this festival.

History
The worship of Sastha forms part of the ancient history of south India.The deity here is believed to be 800 years old. The written history is available since the temple management came under the Edapally royal family. Post-monarchy, the temple was managed by local landlords and Nair Service Society (NSS) Karayogam until 1978 when it was transferred to a broad committee with members from various Hindu sects.

In 2018, as part of a major renovation, the Chuttambalam,the outer structure surrounding the sanctum sanctorum(Garbhagriha) within the temple walls, was removed. After 5 years, in January 2023 the new temple entirely made of stone, wood and copper was inaugurated with Brahmakalashabhisheka.Built to sustain for ages, the temple in its new avatar itself is a milestone in the history of the village.

Architecture
Until 2018, the temple structure was made of bricked walls and clay tile roofs supported on wooden battens. During the major renovation, the walls of Chuttambalam and sub deities were completely made of Krishnashila(Black natural stone).The roofs are covered with copper sheets and the Balikkalpura 's ceiling has carvings on wood and the entablature has layers and the corners have dragon shapes spectacularly painted.

The Aanakkottil(a structure found in the courtyards of temples across Kerala) has 10 enhanced pillars with each pillar having projected standalone Dashavatara(the 10 incarnations of lord Vishnu) sculpture beautifully mural painted. The temple compound walls are built in Aanappalla style(the vertical cross section of the wall resembles an elephant viewed from its back) which is an ancient style found in temples.

Gajamela

On the last day of the temple festival,Gajamela is usually conducted in the East Panthal(pavilion) of the temple followed by famous Aanayoottu. Elephants are given rice balls mixed with fruits and nuts.

References

External links
 Official Facebook page of temple

A video of Gajamela conducted in 2007

Temple Website

Hindu temples in Kottayam district